Microsoft Surface is a series of touchscreen-based personal computers, tablets, and interactive whiteboards designed and developed by Microsoft, most of them running the Windows operating system. They are designed to be premium devices that set examples for manufacturers of other Windows-compatible products. It comprises several generations of hybrid tablets, 2-in-1 detachable notebooks, a convertible desktop all-in-one, an interactive whiteboard, and various accessories, many with unique form factors. The majority of devices in the Surface lineup are based on Intel processors and compatible with Windows 10 or Windows 11.

Devices 
The Surface family features ten main lines of devices:

 The Surface Go line of hybrid tablets, with optional detachable keyboard accessories and optional digital pen. The latest model is the Surface Go 3.
 The Surface Pro line of hybrid tablets, with similar, optional detachable keyboard accessories and optional digital pen. The latest model is the Surface Pro 9, which comes in 4 colour options and 2 different architectures, the ARM-based SQ3 SoC or Intel 12th Gen Alder Lake.
 The Surface Laptop Go, introduced by Microsoft in October 2020, the Laptop Go is marketed as a more affordable alternative to the brand's premium laptops.
 The Surface Laptop, a notebook with a 13.5-inch or 15-inch non-detachable touchscreen. The original device runs Windows 10 S by default; however, it can be upgraded to Windows 10 Pro.
 The Surface Book, a notebook with a detachable tablet screen. The base is configurable with or without discrete graphics and an independently operable tablet screen, on which the optional digital pen functions. The digital pen is sold separately from the latest Surface Book model.
 The Surface Laptop Studio, the successor to the Surface Book product line.
 The Surface Studio, a 28-inch all-in-one desktop that adjusts into a digital drafting table with stylus and on-screen Surface Dial support.
 The Surface Hub, a touch screen interactive whiteboard designed for collaboration.
 The Surface Laptop SE, an entry-level laptop for education running Windows 11 SE.
 The Surface Duo, a dual-screen foldable Android phone.

History 
Microsoft first announced Surface at an event on June 18, 2012, presented by former CEO Steve Ballmer in Milk Studios Los Angeles. Surface was the first major initiative by Microsoft to integrate its Windows operating system with its own hardware, and is the first PC designed and distributed solely by Microsoft.

Sinofsky initially stated that pricing for the first Surface would be comparable to other ARM devices and pricing for Surface Pro would be comparable to current ultrabooks. Later, Ballmer noted the "sweet spot" for the bulk of the PC market was $300 to $800. Microsoft revealed the pricing and began accepting preorders for the 2012 Surface tablet, on October 16, 2012  "for delivery by 10/26". The device was launched alongside the general availability of Windows 8 on October 26, 2012. Surface Pro became available the following year on February 9, 2013.  The devices were initially available only at Microsoft Stores retail and online, but availability was later expanded into other vendors.

In November 2012,  Ballmer described the distribution approach to Surface as "modest" and on November 29 of that year, Microsoft revealed the pricing for the 64 GB and 128 GB versions of Surface with Windows 8 Pro. The tablet would go on sale on February 9, 2013, in the United States and Canada. A launch event was set to be held on February 8, 2013, but was cancelled at the last minute due to the February 2013 nor'easter. The 128GB version of the tablet sold out on the same day as its release. Though there was less demand for the 64GB version because of the much smaller available storage capacity, supplies of the lower cost unit were almost as tight.

The following year, on March 30, 2015, it announced the Surface 3, a more compact version of the Surface Pro 3. On September 8, 2015, Microsoft announced the "Surface Enterprise Initiative", a partnership between Accenture, Avanade, Dell Inc., and HP, to "enable more customers to enjoy the benefits of Windows 10." As part of the partnership, Dell will resell Surface Pro products through its business and enterprise channels, and offer its existing enterprise services (including Pro Support, warranty, and Configuration and Deployment) for Surface Pro devices it sells.

Microsoft announced the next generation Surface Pro 4 and the all new Surface Book, a hybrid laptop, at Microsoft October 2015 Event in New York on October 10, 2015. Microsoft began shipping Surface Hub devices on March 25, 2016. In June 2016, Microsoft confirmed production of the Surface 3 would stop in December of that year. No replacement product has been announced. Reports suggest this may be a consequence of Intel discontinuing the Broxton iteration of the Atom processor. On October 26, 2016, at Microsoft's event, a Surface Studio and Surface Book with Performance Base was announced. A wheel accessory, the Surface Dial, was announced as well, and became available on November 10, 2016.

Immediately following the announcement of the Surface Laptop at the #MicrosoftEDU event on May 2, 2017, and the Microsoft Build 2017 developer conference, Microsoft announced the fifth-generation Surface Pro at a special event in Shanghai on May 23, 2017.

On May 15, 2018, Microsoft announced the Surface Hub 2, featuring a new rotating hinge and the ability to link multiple Hubs together.

In June 2018, Microsoft announced the Surface Go, a $400 Surface tablet with a 10-inch screen and 64 or 128 GB of storage.

On October 2, 2019, Microsoft announced the Surface Pro 7, the Surface Laptop 3, and the Surface Pro X. Both the Surface Pro 7 and the Surface Laptop 3 come with a USB-C port. The Surface Pro X comes with the Microsoft SQ1 ARM processor. Microsoft also teased upcoming products: the Surface Neo, a dual screen tablet originally planned to run Windows 10X; and the Surface Duo, a dual screen mobile phone that runs Android. Both products were initially announced to be released in 2020, though reports suggest the release of the Surface Neo will be delayed until 2021. The Surface Duo was released on September 10, 2020.

On September 22, 2021, Microsoft announced the Surface Pro 8, the Surface Duo 2 and the Surface Laptop Studio.

Processor 
The first-generation Surface uses a quad-core Nvidia Tegra 3 of the ARM architecture, as opposed to the Intel x64 architecture and therefore shipped with Windows RT, which was written for the ARM architecture. The second-generation Surface 2 added an Nvidia Tegra 4. The architecture limited Surface and Surface 2 to only apps from the Windows Store recompiled for ARM. With the release of the Surface 3, Microsoft switched the Surface line to the Intel x64 architecture, the same architecture found in the Surface Pro line. Surface 3 uses the Braswell Atom X7 processor.

The 2019 Surface Pro X uses a custom ARM64 SOC, the Microsoft SQ1. The latest model uses an updated version of the SOC, known as Microsoft SQ2.

Storage 
The Surface devices are released in six internal storage capacities: 32, 64, 128, 256, 512 GB and 1 TB. With the release of the third generation, the 32 GB model was discontinued. All models except the Surface Pro X also feature a microSDXC card slot, located behind the kickstand, which allow for the use of memory cards up to 200 GB.

Microsoft's Surface/Storage site revealed that the 32 GB Surface RT has approximately 16 GB of user-available storage and the 64 GB Surface RT has roughly 45 GB.

External color and kickstand 
The exterior of the earlier generations of Surface (2012 tablet, Pro, and Pro 2) is made of VaporMg magnesium alloy giving a semi-glossy black durable finish that Microsoft calls "dark titanium". Originally, the design of Surface was to feature a full "VaporMg" design, but the production models ditched this and went with a "VaporMg" coating. Later devices moved towards a matte gray finish showing the actual magnesium color through the semi-transparent top coating. The Surface Laptop is available in four colors: platinum, graphite gold, burgundy, and cobalt blue.

The Surface and Surface Pro lines feature a kickstand which flips out from the back of the device to prop it up, allowing the device to be stood up at an angle hands-free. According to Microsoft, this is great for watching movies, video chatting, and typing documents. According to some reviewers, this kickstand is uncomfortable to use in one's lap and means the device won't fit on shallow desks. The first generation has a kickstand that can be set to a 22 degrees angle position. The second generation added a 55 degrees angle position which according to Microsoft makes the device more comfortable to type on the lap. The Surface 3 features three angle positions: 22, 44, and 60 degrees. The Surface Pro 3 is the first device to have a continuous kickstand that can be set at any angles between 22 and 150 degrees. With the fifth-generation Surface Pro, Microsoft added an additional 15 degrees of rotation to the hinge bringing the widest possible angle to 165 degrees, or what Microsoft calls "Studio Mode".

Surface Book 

On October 6, 2015, Microsoft unveiled the Surface Book, a 2-in-1 detachable with a mechanically attached, durable hardware keyboard. It became the first Surface device to be marketed as a laptop instead of a tablet. The device has a teardrop design.

The Surface Book has what Microsoft calls a "dynamic fulcrum hinge" which allows the device to support the heavier notebook/screen portion.

On October 26, 2016, Microsoft unveiled an additional configuration, called the Surface Book with Performance Base, which has an upgraded processor and a longer battery life.

The second generation Surface Book 2 was announced on October 17, 2017, introducing an upgraded ceramic hinge for stability, and lighter overall weight distribution. A 15-inch model was added to the line.

On May 6, 2020, the third generation Surface Book 3 was announced, featuring 10th-generation Intel processors, improved battery life, and faster SSD storage.

Surface Laptop 

On May 3, 2017, Microsoft unveiled the Surface Laptop, a non-detachable version of the Surface Book claiming to have the thinnest touch-enabled LCD panel of its kind. Its permanently attached hardware keyboard comes in four colors and uses the same kind of fabric as the Type Cover accessories for the tablets. The device comes with the newly announced Windows 10 S operating system, which enables faster boot times at the expense of the ability to download and install programs from the web instead of the Microsoft Store. Users can switch to a fully enabled version of Windows 10 for free.

Surface Studio 

On October 26, 2016, Microsoft announced a 28-inch all-in-one desktop PC, the Surface Studio. The device claims to have the thinnest LCD ever made in an all-in-one PC. All its components, including the processor and a surround-sound system, are located in a compact base on which the screen is mounted upon via a flexible, four-point hinge. The design allows the screen to fold down to a 20-degree angle for physical interaction with the user. It comes with the Windows 10 Anniversary Update preinstalled, but is optimized for the Windows 10 Creators Update released in April 2017.

Surface Hub 

On January 21, 2015, Microsoft introduced a new device category under the Surface family: the Surface Hub. It is an 84-inch 120 Hz 4K or 55-inch 1080p multi-touch, multi-pen, wall-mounted all-in-one device, aimed for collaboration and videoconferencing use of businesses. The device runs a variant of the Windows 10 operating system.

Surface Neo 

On October 2, 2019, Microsoft unveiled the Surface Neo, an upcoming dual-screen tablet. The device is a folio with two 9-inch displays that can be used in various configurations ("postures"), including a laptop-like form where a Bluetooth keyboard is attached to the bottom screen. Depending on its position, the remainder of the touchscreen can be used for different features; the keyboard can be attached at the top to use the bottom as a touchpad, or at the bottom to display a special area above the keyboard (the "wonderbar"), which can house tools such as emojis. The device was originally planned to run a new Windows 10 edition known as Windows 10X, which was designed specifically for this class of devices. However, Microsoft eventually discontinued Windows 10X. At this time, it is unknown which version of Windows it will run.

Surface Duo 

Alongside the Surface Neo, Microsoft also unveiled the Surface Duo, a dual-screen Android mobile device with a similar design.

Software 
The original Surface and Surface 2 models use Windows RT, a special version of Windows 8 designed for devices with ARM processors and cannot be upgraded to Windows 10. However, there were several major updates made available after its initial release that include Windows RT 8.1, RT 8.1 Update 1, RT 8.1 August update, and  RT 8.1 Update 3. These older, ARM-based models of Surface are not compatible with Windows 10, but received several new features including a new Start menu similar to that found in early preview builds of Windows 10.

From Surface Pro 4 and onward, all Surface devices support Windows Hello facial biometric authentication out of the box through its cameras and IR-sensors. The Surface Pro 3 can utilize the Surface Pro 4 Type Cover with Fingerprint ID to gain Windows Hello support.

Specialized software 
Prior to the release of Windows 10, on Surface Pro 3 Microsoft made the Surface Hub app available, which allowed the adjustment of Pen pressure sensitivity and button functions. The Surface Hub app was renamed "Surface" following the launch of the Surface Hub device. Additionally, toggles to control sound quality and to disable the capacitive Windows button on the Surface 3 and Pro 3 devices were included.

With Surface Pro 3 and the Surface Pen based on N-Trig technology, Microsoft added the capability to launch OneNote from the lock screen without logging in by pressing the purple button at the top of the pen. Microsoft added sections to Windows 10 settings that have the ability to control the functions of the buttons on the Surface Pen. One such function is to launch OneNote with the press of the top button of the Surface Pro 4 pen. With the introduction of the Surface Dial, Microsoft added a Wheel settings section to the Settings app in Windows 10 under Devices. The Windows 10 Anniversary Update added the ability to adjust the shortcuts of each of the Pen's buttons performed.

Accessories 

There are two main versions of the keyboard covers that connect via the Accessory Spine on the Surface tablets. The now discontinued Touch Cover, and the ever-evolving Type Cover. They feature a multi-touch touchpad, and a full QWERTY keyboard (with pre-defined action keys in place of the function row, though the function row is still accessible via the function button). The covers are made of various soft-touch materials and connect to the Surface with a polycarbonate spine with pogo pins.

Microsoft sells the Surface Pen, an active-digitizer pen, separate of Surface, but included it in all Surface tablets until the fifth-generation Surface Pro where it was removed. The Surface Pen is designed to integrate with inking capabilities on Windows including OneNote.

Remix project 
In 2013, Microsoft announced that they were going to design other covers for the Surface accessory spine (code named "blades") based on the Touch Cover 2's sensors. The only product that was shipped was the Surface Music Cover and the Surface Music Kit app.

Model comparison

Surface and Surface Go line

Surface Pro line

Surface Book line

Surface Laptop line

Surface Studio line

Promotion

Television commercial 
In October 2012, Microsoft aired its first commercial, directed by Jon Chu, for the Surface product line. The first 30-second commercial is the Surface Movement which focus on Windows RT version of the first generation of Surface with detachable keyboard and kickstand. It first aired during Dancing with the Stars commercial break.

Partnership with NFL 
In 2014, Microsoft announced a five-year, $400 million deal with the National Football League, in which Surface became the official tablet computer brand of the NFL. As part of the partnership, special, ruggedized Surface Pro 2 devices were issued to teams for use on the sidelines, allowing coaches and players view and annotate footage of previous plays. The partnership was initially hampered by television commentators, who erroneously referred to the devices as being an "iPad" on several occasions. Microsoft has since stated that it "coached" commentators on properly referring to the devices on-air.

Designed on Surface 
On January 11, 2016, Microsoft announced a collaboration with POW! WOW!. It includes a group of artists from around the world that utilizes various Surface devices, such as the Surface Pro 4 and the Surface Book, to create a total of 17 murals. The artists are filmed using their Surface devices and explain how they integrate Surface into their workflow. The final products are then posted to YouTube that accompanies a post on the Microsoft Devices blog.

United States Department of Defense 
On February 17, 2016, Microsoft announced that alongside the US Department of Defense's plans to upgrade to Windows 10, that it has approved Surface devices and certified them for use through the Defense Information Systems Agency Unified Capabilities Approved Products List. Surface Book, Surface Pro 4, Surface Pro 3, and Surface 3 have all been approved as Multifunction Mobile Devices, thus meeting the necessary requirements for security and compatibility with other systems.

Reception 

Reviews of the first-generation Surface RT by critics ranged broadly. The hardware received mostly positive reviews, while the software and overall experience were mixed. Wired reviewer Mathew Honan stated that while "This is one of the most exciting pieces of hardware I’ve ever used. It is extremely well-designed; meticulous even," the tablets are "likely to confuse many of Microsoft’s longtime customers". TechCrunch, Matt Buchanan at BuzzFeed, and Gizmodo recommended against purchasing the tablet. Gizmodo mentioned issues such as the high price tag and described it as similar but inferior to the iPad, but also praised the hardware saying, "You'll appreciate it every time you pick it up and turn it on. It's a simple, joyful experience." David Pogue at The New York Times praised the hardware but criticized the software. The Verge described the technology as fulfilling the role of a laptop or tablet "half as well as other devices on the market," adding "the whole thing is honestly perplexing." Warner Crocker from Gotta Be Mobile described it as "frustratingly confusing." Farhad Manjoo of Slate noted that the "shortcomings are puzzling" given how much time Microsoft spent developing the device. Neil McAllister has noted the lack of a compelling case to switch from the iPad to a Windows RT device at the same price point, because Apple already has a strong network effect from their app developers and few Windows developers have ported their offerings over to the ARM processor. The Surface RT had worse battery life than similar devices. 

The Surface Pro 3 garnered positive reviewers. David Pogue suggested "The upshot is that, with hardly any thickness or weight penalty, the kickstand and the Type Cover let you transform your 1.8-pound tablet into an actual, fast, luxury laptop". Pogue said that the Surface Pro 3's form factor works well as a tablet, in contrast to the Surface Pro 2, whose bulk and weight limited its appeal as a tablet. Pogue also stated that the new multi-stage kickstand, 3:2 screen aspect ratio, and new Type Cover 3 detachable keyboard made it a competent laptop. Another advantage of the Surface Pro 3 is that it is considered a tablet by the FAA and TSA, despite its hardware which makes it capable of running all x86 Windows programs. This is advantageous in air travel, since a tablet can be used during takeoff or landing, and a tablet can be left in a bag when going through a TSA scanner machine, neither of which apply to a laptop. It has been suggested that the Surface Pro 3 comes closest to the Microsoft Tablet PC concept that company founder Bill Gates announced in 2001, being the first Surface to become a credible laptop replacement. Time magazine included Microsoft Surface Pro 3 in the list of the 25 best inventions of 2014.

The Surface 3 (non-Pro) received generally positive reviews from computer critics. They praised Microsoft's shift from ARM architecture toward x86, and therefore from Windows RT to a regular Windows OS. Most noted a well designed chassis and accessories produced of quality materials, and overall premium feeling of use. While less powerful, the Surface 3 was a lighter and cheaper alternative to the Surface Pro 3. More importantly, the Surface 3 could compete at the high-end of Android and iPad tablets, with the advantage of being a device running a full desktop OS instead of a mobile OS for a similar price. Reviewers also note that 37 GB of the total storage space in the low-end Surface 3 is available to the user, while its close competitor, the low-end iPad Air 2, has only 12.5 GB of user-available storage space for the same price. The most common downsides are relatively low battery life, slower performance compared to devices with Intel Core processors and a high price since accessories like Surface Pen and Type Cover are not included.

Industry response 
When Surface was first announced, critics noted that the device represented a significant departure for Microsoft, as the company had previously relied exclusively on third-party OEMs to produce devices running Windows, and began shifting towards a first-party hardware model with similarities to that of Apple. Steve Ballmer said that like Xbox, Surface was an example of the sort of hardware products Microsoft will release in the future.

Original equipment manufacturers (OEMs), whose products have traditionally run Microsoft operating systems, have had positive responses to the release of Surface. HP, Lenovo, Samsung, and Dell applauded Microsoft's decision to create its own Tablet PC and said that relationships with Microsoft have not changed. John Solomon, senior vice president of HP, said that "Microsoft was basically making a leadership statement and showing what's possible in the tablet space". Acer founder Stan Shih said that he believed Microsoft only introduced its own hardware in order to establish the market and would then withdraw in favor of its OEMs.

However, others believe that OEMs were left sidelined by the perception that Microsoft's new tablet would replace their products. Acer chairman JT Wang advised Microsoft to "please think twice". Microsoft has acknowledged that Surface may "affect their commitment" of partners to the Windows platform.

The need for the Surface to market an ARM-compatible version of Windows was questioned by analysts because of recent developments in the PC industry; both Intel and AMD introduced x86-based system-on-chip designs for Windows 8, Atom "Clover Trail" and "Temash" respectively, in response to the growing competition from ARM licensees. In particular, Intel claimed that Clover Trail-based tablets could provide battery life rivaling that of ARM devices; in a test by PC World, Samsung's Clover Trail-based Ativ Smart PC was shown to have battery life exceeding that of the first gen ARM-based Surface. Peter Bright of Ars Technica argued that Windows RT had no clear purpose, since the power advantage of ARM-based devices was "nowhere near as clear-cut as it was two years ago", and that users would be better off purchasing Office 2013 themselves because of the removed features and licensing restrictions of Office RT.

Sales 

Sales of the first generation Surface did not meet Microsoft's expectations, which led to price reductions and other sales incentives.

In July 2013, Steve Ballmer revealed that the Surface hasn't sold as well as he hoped. He reported that Microsoft had made a loss of  due to the lackluster Surface sales. This was followed by a further price cut in August after it was revealed that even the marketing costs had exceed the sales. On August 4, 2013, the cost of Surface Pro was cut by $100 giving it an entry price of $799. Several law firms sued Microsoft, accusing the company of misleading shareholders about sales of the first-gen ARM based Surface tablet, calling it an "unmitigated disaster". In the first two years of sales, Microsoft lost almost two billion dollars.

The poor sales of the ARM-based Surface tablet had been credited to the continuing market dominance of Microsoft's competitors in the tablet market. Particularly, Apple's iPad retained its dominance due its App store offering the most tablet-optimized applications. Most OEMs opted to produce tablets running Google Android, which came in a wide variety of sizes and prices (albeit with mixed success among most OEMs), and Google Play had the second-largest selection of tablet applications. By contrast there was a limited amount of software designed specifically for Surface's operating system, Windows RT, the selection which was even weaker than Windows Phone. Indeed, OEMs reported that most customers felt Intel-based tablets were more appropriate for use in business environments, as they were compatible with the much more widely available x86 programs while Windows RT was not. Microsoft's subsequent efforts have been focused upon refining the Surface Pro and making it a viable competitor in the premium ultra-mobile PC category, against other Ultrabooks and the MacBook Air, while discontinuing development of ARM-powered Surface devices as the Surface 3 (non-Pro) had an Intel x86 CPU (albeit with lower performance than the Surface Pro 3).

The resultant Surface Pro 3 succeeded in garnering a great interest in the Surface line, making Surface business profitable for the first time in fiscal year Q1 2015. Later in Q2, the Surface division's sales topped $1 billion. Surface division scored $888 million for Q4 2015 despite an overall loss of $2.1 billion for Microsoft, a 117% year-over-year growth thanks to the steady commercial performance of Surface Pro 3 and the launch of mainstream model Surface 3. In the first quarter of fiscal year 2018 the Surface division posted its best earnings performance to date.

Reported issues 
Users on Microsoft's support forum reported that some Touch Covers were splitting at the seam where it connects to the tablet, exposing its wiring. A Microsoft spokesperson stated that the company was aware of the issue, and would offer free replacements for those who have been affected by the defect.  Other users reported issues with audio randomly stuttering or muting on the Surface tablet while in use. Wi-Fi connectivity issues were also reported. Firmware updates that attempted to fix the problem were released, but some users still reported problems like blue screen errors while watching video and crash of display driver. Microsoft has acknowledged a bug in the Windows key that does not always work, but has promised a fix. The latest update, which promised to fix the issue, was not able to fix it.

With the original Surface Pro, Microsoft acknowledged issues encountered by some users with its digital pen, including intermittent pen failures, and with older applications that do not have complete pen support due to the different APIs used by Surface Pro's stylus drivers. In the latter case, Microsoft has indicated that it is working with software vendors to ensure better compatibility. As for later models beginning with the Surface Pro 3, the N-Trig digital pen digitizer system has attained high pen compatibility with older applications thanks to a regularly updated, optional WinTab driver.  Issues had also been experienced with slow Wi-Fi connectivity, and the device not properly returning from standby.

iFixit has awarded the Surface Pro its worst ever repairability rating, but CEO Kyle Wiens claims that it is due to incompetence rather than deliberate design choices.

Timeline

See also 

 Microsoft PixelSense, a product line launched in 2007 and formerly called Microsoft Surface
 Comparison of tablet computers
 Microsoft Lumia

References

External links 

 
 Building of Surface

 
Tablet computers introduced in 2012
Windows RT devices
Microsoft Surface